Greenacre is a surname. Notable people with the surname include:

Benjamin Wesley Greenacre, South African politician
Chris Greenacre (born 1977), English footballer and manager
James Greenacre (1785–1837), English murderer
Phyllis Greenacre (1894–1989), American psychoanalyst and physician